Debris is the debut album by British actress and musician Keeley Forsyth, released in 2020.

Background
The songs for Debris were initially written by Forsyth, accompanying herself on harmonium and accordion. The pieces were then arranged collaboratively with musician Matthew Bourne, who Forsyth contacted after hearing him on the radio.

The Quietus described the album as a "brooding, melancholic listen [and] full of gut-wrenching lines".

The first single, "Debris", was released on 22 October 2019 accompanied by a video directed by Maxine Peake. Second single "Start Again" was released on 28 November 2019. Clash magazine called the song "a bold display of creative confidence".

Track listing
All compositions by Forsyth. Arranged by Forsyth, Matthew Bourne and Sam Hobbs.

 "Debris" – 2:43
 "Black Bull" – 3:02
 "It's Raining" – 4:27
 "Look To Yourself" – 4:53
 "Lost" – 2:40
 "Butterfly" – 3:50
 "Large Oak" - 2:24
 "Start Again" - 3:26

See also
List of 2020 albums

References

2020 albums
The Leaf Label albums